Myopsyche bokumae is a moth of the subfamily Arctiinae. It was described by Sergius G. Kiriakoff in 1954. It is found in the Democratic Republic of the Congo.

References

Arctiinae
Moths described in 1954
Endemic fauna of the Democratic Republic of the Congo